Cairn Toul ('hill of the barn') is the fourth-highest mountain in Scotland and all of the British Isles, after Ben Nevis, Ben Macdui and Braeriach. The summit is 1,291 metres (4,236 feet) above sea level. It is in the western massif of the Cairngorms, linked by a bealach at about 1125 m to Braeriach. The mountain towers above the Lairig Ghru pass.

Cairn Toul is often climbed together with other peaks. From the south, it may be climbed with The Devil's Point, which lies about 2.5 kilometres south-southeast. Alternatively, it may be climbed from the north, including Braeriach and Sgor an Lochain Uaine. Both routes are long days by Scottish standards: around 15 km (plus return) regardless of whether one starts from Coire Cas above Speyside, or Linn of Dee to the south. The mountain may also be climbed from the west, starting from Achlean in Glen Feshie. This provides for a slighter shorter route (around 27 km for the round trip), though the walker must negotiate a large expanse of undulating boggy plateau in order to reach the Breariach-Cairn Toul massif.

There is a bothy, Corrour, at the point below Cairn Toul in the defile of the Lairig Ghru.

See also
 List of Munro mountains
 Mountains and hills of Scotland

References

Munros
Marilyns of Scotland
Mountains and hills of the Cairngorms
Mountains and hills of Aberdeenshire
Places and place names on Mar Lodge Estate
One-thousanders of Scotland